Zhang Guoli (born 17 January 1955) is a Chinese actor and film director who was a xiangsheng actor before he started working on films and television series. He is mostly known for his roles playing the Emperor in various dramas involving Qing Dynasty imperial China. He has also hosted the CCTV New Year's Gala in 2014.

He is married to actress Deng Jie and he has a son named Zhang Mo from a previous marriage, who is also an actor. Zhang is a practising Buddhist and a member of the Taiwanese Buddhist organisation Dharma Drum Mountain. He has a dharma name, Changsheng (常升).

Filmography

References

External links

Zhang Guoli at the Chinese Movie Database

 

1955 births
Living people
Male actors from Tianjin
Film directors from Tianjin
Members of the 12th Chinese People's Political Consultative Conference
Members of the China National Democratic Construction Association
People's Republic of China Buddhists
Chinese male stage actors
Chinese xiangsheng performers
Chinese male film actors
Chinese male television actors
Chinese male voice actors
Hosts of the CCTV New Year's Gala
Chinese film directors